The  Indian Army Corps of Engineers is a combat support arm which provides combat engineering support, develops infrastructure for armed forces and other defence organisations and maintains connectivity along the borders, besides helping the civil authorities during natural disasters. College of Military Engineering, Pune (CME) is the premier technical and tactical training institution of the Indian Army Corps of Engineers.

The Corps consists of three groups of combat engineers, namely the Madras Sappers, the Bengal Sappers and the Bombay Sappers.

It has a long history dating back to the mid-18th century. The earliest existing subunit of the Corps (18 Field Company) dates back to 1777 while the Corps officially recognises its birth as 1780 when the senior-most group of the Corps, the Madras Sappers were raised. A group is roughly analogous to a brigade of the Indian infantry, each group consisting of a number of engineer regiments. The engineer regiment is the basic combat engineer unit, analogous to an infantry battalion. Besides the combat engineers, the Corps mans and operates major engineering organisations such as the Military Engineer Services, the Border Roads Organisation (BRO), the Married Accommodation Project and the Survey of India.

History

The Corps of Engineers is one of the oldest arms of the Indian Army. The origin of the Corps dates back to 1780 when the two regular pioneer companies were raised in the Madras Presidency Army. Subsequently, the Group of Madras, Bengal and Bombay Sappers were formed in their respective presidencies. These Groups came together when the British Indian Army was formed after 1857 and were later merged on 18 November 1932 to form the Corps of Indian Engineers. Engineer Groups initially consisted of field companies (a sub-unit organisation that exists to this day).

Till 1911, the Sappers also had the duty of passing battlefield messages. Between 1911 and 1920, they handed this task to a batch of their own kinsmen who then formed the Corps of Signals. The Sappers also contributed the first batch of airmen when the Indian Air Force was raised in 1932. From 1942-1945 officers of the Indian Railways were recruited into this Corps to participate in Britain's Burma Campaign.

Combat Engineers
In war, Combat Engineers provide mobility to own forces by constructing bridges, tracks and helipads; on the other hand, the Corps denies the same to the enemy by creating obstacles such as laying mine-fields and demolition of bridges. The need for accurate survey arose before combat engineering. Vast holdings had to be carefully delineated and mapped out, to plan the correct form of commercial extraction. By 1780, serious attention began to be given to the art of sapping and mining.

Forts abound in the subcontinent, and to the forts the main defences withdrew for a protracted stand. On being invested, the siege (heavy) artillery including trench mortars or bombards went at it. The real work, not for the faint-hearted, went to the sappers who had to do the 'sapping' or mining. Sapping is the technique of accurately digging trenches, usually covered or zigzag, to cover one's approach to the point of assault.
Corps of Engineers played a very important role on "OP Vijay" the Kargil war. The major Engineer Regiments which very actively took part were 108 Engineer Regiment as a part of 08 Mountain Division, 02 Engineer Regiment as a part of 03 Mountain Division, 106 Engineer Regiment as a part of 15 Corps and 112 Engineer as a part of 92 Mountain Brigade during operation than subsequently became the part of newly raised 14 Corps. The action areas and the commanding officers of these Engineer Regiments are appended below:-
1. 108 Engr. Regt. Commanded by Col. Rohit Mohan Chaudhri, and the Regt. operated in Drass sector under 08 Mtn. Div. The unit was awarded Battle  Honour and theatre Honour. Was also awarded COAS Unit Citation for War.
2. 02 Engr. Regt. Commanded by Col. Krishnan, and operated initially in Drass sector than Chor Batala and Siachin sector under 03 Mtn. Div. The unit was awarded theatre honour
3. 106 Engr. Regt. Commanded by Col. I.P.S. Ahuja and operated in Drass & Kargil sector under 16 Corps HQ. The unit was awarded COAS UNit citation of war
4. 112 Engr. Regt. Commanded by Col. N.B.Saxena and operated in Daha & Ganasak sector under 92 Mtn. Bde. as brought in for operations from 33 Corps located from Sukhna. The unit was awarded COAS Unit Citation of war

Military Engineer Services

The Military Engineer Services (MES) are responsible for the design, construction and maintenance of all works, buildings, airfields, dock installations, etc., together with accessory services such as military roads, water and electricity supply, drainage, refrigeration, furniture, required by the Army, Navy, Air Force & Coast Guard in India.

It is one of the largest construction and maintenance agencies in India with a total annual budget to the tune of  13,000 crores.  It has a large number of units and sub-units spread across the entire country to provide engineering support to various formations of Army, Air Force, Navy and DRDO.  MES is an inter services organisation under the Ministry of Defence and has both Army and Civilian components of officers (mainly IDSE) and other subordinate staff.

Border Roads Organisation

The Border Roads Organisation (BRO) consists of Border Roads Development Board and GREF. BRDB is headed by the Defence Minister of India as its Chairman and Chief of Army and Air Staff and Defence Secretary as its members and there are other members also and GREF is headed by Lt General of Corps of Engineers known as DGBR. BRO  has made its own contribution to the nation by constructing national highways, airfields, buildings and bridges. The Border Roads, by constructing a large number of roads in once inaccessible areas of the Himalayas, Rajasthan and Northeast India have contributed significantly to their economic development.

The BRO was started on 7 May 1960.  Its first DGBR was Maj Gen K N Dubey.

Decorations
Lt Gen PS Bhagat of the Corps remains the first Indian Officer to have won the Victoria Cross in the Second World War. Another first in the same war, Subedar Subramaniam was awarded the George Cross. Later, during operations in Kashmir soon after Independence, Major Rama Raghoba Rane was awarded the Param Vir Chakra for making a passage through enemy minefields while crawling in front of a tank. Engineer units have been deployed abroad as part of UN Missions.

The Corps of Engineers has to its credit one Param Vir Chakra, one Ashoka Chakra, one Padma Bhushan, 38 Param Vishisht Seva Medals, two Maha Vir Chakras, 13 Kirti Chakras, three Padma Shris, 88 Ati Vishisht Seva Medals, 25 Vir Chakras, 93 Shaurya Chakras, six Yudh Seva Medals and many other awards.

9 Engineer Regiment became one of the youngest Engineer Regiment in world history to enter the battlefield and got as many as 12 decorations including 01 Mahavir Chakra, 03 Vir Chakra, 04 Sena Medal, 04 Mention in Dispatch at the "Battle of Basantar" in 1971.
107 Engineer Regiment gained an Indian Institute of Bridging Engineers award for constructing a bridge in Himachal Pradesh in 2001.
268 Engineer Regiment was raised in 1964. As of 2009 it is based 'somewhere in the western sector'. 69 Engineer Regiment was raised in 2005. As of 2006 it is based at Chandigarh.

Engineer regiments that served with the Indian Peace Keeping Force in Sri Lanka included the 3, 4, 8, 16, 51, 53, 110, 115 and 270.

Lieutenant General Manoj Chandrashekhar Pande will be the first Chief of the Army Staff who is from Indian Army Corps of Engineers.

See also
 Dalvir Singh
 Gurnam Singh (soldier)
 First Indian circumnavigation
 Trishna (yacht)

References

External links
Indian Army, Corps of Engineers
 Royal Engineers Museum Indian Sappers (1740–1947)
 Royal Engineers Museum The Corps in the Second World War (1939–45)- Indian Engineers in the Western Desert, Italian and Burma Campaigns
 Royal Engineers Museum Biography of Lord Kitchener
 9 Engineer Regiment during 1971 war

 
Military engineer corps
British Indian Army regiments
Indian World War II regiments
Military units and formations established in 1777